Stalin  is a 2006 Indian Telugu-language action political drama film directed by A. R. Murugadoss. It stars Chiranjeevi and Trisha while Prakash Raj, Sharada, Khushbu Sundar, Pradeep Rawat, and Brahmanandam play supporting roles. The film was screened at the International Film Festival of India in the mainstream section. 

The film released on 20 September 2006. The film producer Nagendra Babu won for Nandi Special Jury Award. The film was also dubbed and released into Tamil under the same title, and remade into Hindi as Jai Ho in 2014. The core plot of the movie was reported to be based on the 2000 movie Pay It Forward.

Plot 
The only mission in Stalin's life is to help others and make the world a better place. It turns out that he served as a Major in the Indian Army. Although a war hero, he quit the army after a rift with Lt. Col. Iqbal Kakar when he transfers him to the administrative division from the battlefield as a disciplinary action. His family includes his mother and sister Jhansi, who is not in talking terms with their mother since she married a Punjabi.

Stalin keeps helping a physically challenged girl named Sumati write her intermediate examination, and her suicide disturbs him. The death occurs as none of the people around her extend help. Stalin then plans a chain system. The theme works on a principle that everyone should help others, and in return, they should not seek a mere thanks but tell those who get the help to help three more, with a condition that those who get help from them should also demand the same. Stalin thinks that this chain will develop helping attitude among the people but unfortunately finds that the chain did not work. On one occasion, he bashes a rich boy who injured a beggar.

This goes in a chain reaction, and the rich boy employs goons to attack Stalin. As Stalin disappears from the scene, the goons take Jhansi and her friend Chitra into their custody. Stalin reaches the spot and hacks the hand of one goon which happens to be the henchman of an MLA, who is the son-in-law of Home Minister Muddu Krishnayya. Krishnayya takes it as a prestige issue and tries to eliminate Stalin but loses his son in the process. When the Chief Minister intervenes to bring in a patch-up, Krishnayya plans to kill him and implicate Stalin in the murder. Stalin saves the injured Chief Minister but experiences a severe chest pain due to exertion.

The reason for the chest pain is a bullet which remained in his chest, very near to his heart. Stalin sustains the bullet injury in the Kargil War, and that was why Iqbal shifted him to the administrative department. Finally, the truth prevails, and the CM returns to the hospital to visit Stalin. The "help three people" concept was his brainchild, which saved him from death in the form of a schoolgirl. Finally, the doctors successfully remove the bullet in a very delicate surgery. Krishnayya also gets arrested. Stalin realises that his "help three people" concept worked well, and the same theme saved his life in the form of an auto driver. He thanks everyone for making his concept a success.

Cast 

 Chiranjeevi as Major Stalin
 Trisha as Chitra
 Prakash Raj as Home Minister Muddu Krishnayya
 Sharada as Stalin's mother
 Khushbu Sundar as Jhansi (Stalin's sister)
 Pradeep Rawat as MLA
 Brahmanandam as Priest
 Mukesh Rishi as Lt. Col. Iqbal Kakar
 Riyaz Khan as Muddu Krishnayya's son
 Ravali as Muddu Krishnayya's daughter
 Sunil as Stalin's brother
 Siva Reddy as Stalin´s brother
 Harshavardhan as Stalin's brother
 Baby Annie as Stalin's friend's daughter
 Hema as Chitra's mother
 Sudeepa Pinky as Chitra's sister
 Brahmaji as Captain Rao
 Suman as Doctor
 Delhi Kumar as Chief Minister 
 Subbaraju as Goon
 Amit Tiwari as Goon
 Mounica as Lakshmi
 L. B. Sriram as Auto Driver
 Gangadhar Pandey as Doctor
 Ravi Prakash as Software Engineer
 Meena Kumari as Sireesha
 Surekha Vani as Baby's mother
 Supreeth as Malli
 Chatrapathi Sekhar as Venkadri
 Narsing Yadav as Amarpet Abbulu
 Paruchuri Venkateswara Rao as Advisor of Muddu Krishnayya
 Gopichand Malineni
 Anushka Shetty in a special song

Music

Audio of Stalin was launched on 22 August 2006 at a jam pack auditorium of Lalitha Kala Vedika in Public Gardens, Hyderabad. Pawan Kalyan launched the audio of gave the first cassette to Nimmagadda Prasad (Matrix Labs) and Murali Krishnam Raju (MAA TV). The film has six songs composed by Mani Sharma, with lyrics by Anantha Sriram, Pedada Murthy, Kadikonda & Suddala Ashok Teja.

Reception

Critical reception
The film received mixed to positive reviews. Jeevi of idlebrain.com praised the performances of Chiranjeevi and Khushboo and stated that "First half of the film is pretty mediocre as there is no conflict thread in terms of villain. Second half is better from the moment villain enters the scene. The last 20 minutes of the film stands out with very good emotions." Sify.com gave it 3 on 5 stars as well and stated "The much hyped Murugadoss directed Stalin does not have Chiru as the comic book superhero in the first half. He is basically a do-gooder for his fellow-men as he attempts to make the world a better place to live. Chiru in such a role may or may not work with the masses but in this refreshingly different role, he is cool with a capital C." Indiaglitz.com also commented "Director Murugadoss, who made us all sit up and take notice through Tagore (story) and Ghajini, once again underlines his talent for making a wholesome and powerful mass masala movie. In Chiranjeevi, he has somebody who can bring to life any kind of idea he (Murugadoss) has. Chiranjeevi, it seems, has been particular about the 'message' aspect — at his stature and seniority, he had every reason to be."

References

External links 
 
 

2006 films
2000s Telugu-language films
Telugu films remade in other languages
Indian action films
Films about social issues in India
2000s masala films
Films directed by AR Murugadoss
Films scored by Mani Sharma
2006 action films